Bugle Caye Lighthouse is a lighthouse in Belize. The station was originally established in 1885 and has a focal plane 19 m (62 ft).

See also
 List of lighthouses in Belize

References

External links
 Belize Port Authority
 Picture of Bugle Caye Lighthouse flickr

Lighthouses completed in 1885
Lighthouses in Belize